Frank Sanfilippo (born September 8, 1981) is an American former soccer player who is currently an assistant coach for the University of San Diego.

Career

College
Sanfilippo was born in San Diego, California, and later attended San José State University where he was a member of the men's soccer team from 2000 to 2004.  In February 2003, the San Jose Earthquakes selected Sanfilippo in the 6th round (56th overall) of the 2003 MLS SuperDraft. He did not sign with the Earthquakes, but remained in school to finish his degree in sociology.

Professional
Sanfilippo signed with Syracuse Salty Dogs in the USL First Division in 2004. The Dogs folded at the end of the 2004 season, and he moved to the Rochester Rhinos in 2005. When Rhinos defender Scott Schweitzer retired at the beginning of the 2006 season, it was Sanfilippo that Rhinos' coach Laurie Calloway called upon to be a steadying force in the Rhinos defense and mentor a young Rhinos backline, which had been devastated from the previous years' retirements, transfers, and injuries. He was equal to the task and helped lead the Rhinos to the USL Championship match. Sanfilippo was named to the 2006 USL-1 All-Star team.

In 2007, he moved to the expansion Carolina RailHawks where he played two seasons, both as team captain. On 20 January 2009, he signed with the Charleston Battery.

Sanfilippo rejoined Rochester Rhinos in February 2010. After one season with the Rhinos, he signed with FC Tampa Bay of the North American Soccer League on February 8, 2011 on a one-year contract with a club option for 2012.

After a successful 2011 season with Tampa Bay, the club exercised its 2012 option on Sanfilippo's contract on October 4, 2011. Two months later, the club signed Sanfilippo to a new contract through the 2014 season.

Sanfilippo spent the 2015 season in South Florida with the Fort Lauderdale Strikers before returning to Tampa Bay on December 21, 2015.

Personal 
Frank Sanfilippo is married to Malissa Rosa Sanfilippo. They were married on November 15, 2008 in San Diego, CA. They have two sons. Francesco Paul Sanfilippo born August 1, 2010 and Dominic Cru Sanfilippo born March 8, 2013.

Honors

Tampa Bay Rowdies
North American Soccer League:
 Champion 2012

Rochester Rhinos
USSF Division 2 Pro League Regular Season Champions: 2010

References

External links
 Tampa Bay Rowdies profile
 USD profile

1981 births
Living people
American soccer players
North Carolina FC players
Charleston Battery players
Tampa Bay Rowdies players
Rochester New York FC players
San Jose State Spartans men's soccer players
Syracuse Salty Dogs players
A-League (1995–2004) players
USL First Division players
USSF Division 2 Professional League players
North American Soccer League players
San Jose Earthquakes draft picks
Soccer players from San Diego
Fort Lauderdale Strikers players
Association football defenders
San Diego Toreros men's soccer coaches